Emilio Antonio Echevarría Noriega (born 3 July 1944) is a Mexican actor.

Career
Echevarría began his acting career in 1978 as a member of the Constitution of Art and Society. He appeared in Amores Perros as the hitman and ex-guerrilla nicknamed "El Chivo" (The Goat), and Y tu mamá también, which also co-starred Gael García Bernal. He has also had small parts in two international productions, first as Raoul, a Cuban agent in the James Bond film Die Another Day and then as Antonio López de Santa Anna in The Alamo.

In 2007, he appeared in El Búfalo de la Noche along with Y tu mamá Tambien co-star Diego Luna, written by Amores Perros author Guillermo Arriaga. In 2011, he played Sabio in a Mexican production of Gabriel Garcia Marquez's "Memories of My Melancholy Whores". The film was directed by Henning Carlsen and also stars Geraldine Chaplin and Ángela Molina.

Filmography

References

External links
Alamo Sentry Interview with Emilio Echevarría

1944 births
Living people
Mexican male film actors